Haldi River is a tributary of Hooghly River flowing through Purba Medinipur district of the Indian state of West Bengal. The Keleghai joins the Kansai at Tangrakhali under Nandakumar Police Station in Tamluk subdivision. The combined stream is called Haldi River. It is the last major river to flow into the Hooghly before the latter flows into the sea. The Haldi joins the Hooghly at the industrial town of Haldia.

See also

List of rivers of India
Rivers of India

References

Rivers of West Bengal
Rivers of India